Elaine Gayle Cheris (born January 8, 1946) is an American Olympic foil and épée fencer.

Early and personal life
Cheris was born in Dothan, Alabama, and is Jewish.  She earned a BS in Physical Education and Sports Psychology at Troy University, where she competed on the men's track team, in 1971.  She married Sam David Cheris, a lawyer, in 1980.

Fencing career
Cheris began fencing at 29 years of age. She was working at the time as the assistant athletic director at a Jewish Community Center in New Haven, Connecticut, where she put together a fencing program and decided to try the sport. In 1979 she quit her job to train for the Olympic tryouts.

Cheris qualified for the 1980 U.S. Olympic team, but did not compete due to the U.S. Olympic Committee's boycott of the 1980 Summer Olympics in Moscow, Russia. She was one of 461 athletes to receive a Congressional Gold Medal instead.

She did compete for the United States in the 1988 Summer Olympics in Seoul in foil at the age of 42 (she was knocked out by Italian silver medalist Laura Chiesa, 15–13), and in the 1996 Summer Olympics in Atlanta in épée at the age of 50 (the second-oldest female US Olympic fencer ever, after Maxine Mitchell). Cheris was an alternate in the 2000 Summer Olympics in Sydney, having missed making the team by one touch.

Cheris won an individual silver medal and a team gold medal at the 1981 Maccabiah Games. At the end of the 1985 season, she was the Number 1 US female foil fencer at age 39. She won a gold medal in team foil at the 1987 Pan American Games, and a gold medal in team épée at the 1991 Pan American Games.

Cheris was inducted into the Colorado Sports Hall of Fame in 1983. In 1993, the Fédération Internationale d'Escrime awarded her its Gold Medal of Honor.

She founded the fencing club the Cheyenne Fencing Society and Modern Pentathlon Center of Denver in Denver, Colorado. Cheris has authored Fencing: Steps to Success (2002).

References

External links
 

1946 births
Living people
American female épée fencers
American female foil fencers
Olympic fencers of the United States
Fencers at the 1988 Summer Olympics
Fencers at the 1996 Summer Olympics
Sportspeople from Dothan, Alabama
Congressional Gold Medal recipients
American female sabre fencers
Jewish American sportspeople
Sportspeople from Denver
Maccabiah Games medalists in fencing
Maccabiah Games gold medalists for the United States
Maccabiah Games silver medalists for the United States
Competitors at the 1981 Maccabiah Games
Fencers at the 1987 Pan American Games
Fencers at the 1991 Pan American Games
Pan American Games medalists in fencing
Pan American Games gold medalists for the United States
Pan American Games silver medalists for the United States
Troy University alumni
Writers from Denver
Jewish women writers
Jewish sportswomen
American women sportswriters
American women non-fiction writers
21st-century American Jews
21st-century American women
Medalists at the 1987 Pan American Games
Medalists at the 1991 Pan American Games